Centauro has been borne by at least three ships of the Italian Navy and may refer to:

 , a  launched in 1906 and lost in 1921.
 , a  launched in 1936 and sunk in 1942.
 , a  launched in 1954 and decommissioned in 1985. 

Italian Navy ship names